Charlie Steele Sr. is a former football (soccer) player who represented New Zealand at international level.

Steele played two A-international matches for the All Whites in 1927, both against the touring Canadians, the first a 2–2 draw on 25 June 1927, the second a 1–2 loss on 2 July.

Steele's son Charlie Steele Jr. later represented New Zealand also, to become the first father - son pair to represent New Zealand.

References

Year of birth missing
Year of death missing
New Zealand association footballers
New Zealand international footballers
Scottish emigrants to New Zealand
Association footballers not categorized by position